Speke railway station was located on East side of Woodend Avenue on the southeastern edge of Liverpool, England.

History 
The station opened in September 1852 and closed on 22 September 1930.

By 1938 no trace of the platforms could be seen.

References

General references

External links
 The station and local lines on multiple maps Rail Maps Online
 The station on a 25" Edwardian OS Map National Library of Scotland
 The station on line WJL2, with mileages Railway Codes

Disused railway stations in Liverpool
Former London and North Western Railway stations
Railway stations in Great Britain opened in 1852
Railway stations in Great Britain closed in 1930
1852 establishments in England